Hudson is an unincorporated community in eastern Bates County, in the U.S. state of Missouri. The community is on a county road just north of Missouri Route 52. The southwest corner of Henry County is one mile to the northeast of the community. Butler is approximately 13 miles to the west-northwest.

History
Hudson was platted in 1867, and named after Henry Hudson. The Hudson post office closed in 1890.

References

Unincorporated communities in Bates County, Missouri
Unincorporated communities in Missouri